The 1997 Rochester mayoral election took place on November 4, 1997 in the city of Rochester, New York, United States. Incumbent William A. Johnson Jr. was elected to a second term as mayor of Rochester.

Candidate

William A. Johnson Jr. - incumbent mayor

Results

References

1997 New York (state) elections
History of Rochester, New York
Mayoral elections in Rochester, New York
Rochester